Tanisha Crasto (born 5 May 2003) is an Indian badminton player who was born in the United Arab Emirates. While formerly representing Bahrain, she won the women's doubles event at the 2016 Bahrain International Challenge partnered with Aprilsasi Putri Lejarsar Variella. In 2017, when she was 14 years old, she created history by winning the Indian Club UAE Open tournament in the women's singles event after beating Negin Amiripour of Iran. She was also part of the Prime Star Sports Academy club that won the Shuttle Time Dubai Club Badminton Championship.

Early life 
Crasto was born in Dubai to Indian parents Tulip and Clifford Crasto from Goa and attended The Indian High School, Dubai.

Career

UAE and Bahrain 
In 2013, Crasto made her international debut for Bahrain in junior tournaments and won her first major BWF international title representing Bahrain at the 2016 Bahrain International Challenge tournament. She is ranked among the top UAE based badminton players. She also became the youngest winner of the UAE Open tournament.

India 
In 2018, after participating in the Gulf-based tournaments, she shifted to India representing Goa in the Indian tournaments. She represented India in the 2019 Badminton Asia Junior Championships and the 2018 and 2019 BWF World Junior Championships.

In 2021, Crasto joined the India national badminton team and participated in the Uber Cup and Sudirman Cup tournaments. She was the runners-up in the mixed doubles event while partnering with Ishaan Bhatnagar at the 2021 Scottish Open.

In 2022, Crasto played her first ever BWF World Tour Super 500 event at the India Open, participating in both the women's doubles (with Rutaparna Panda) and the mixed doubles (with Ishaan Bhatnagar) events. However, she and her respective partners lost in the first rounds of both disciplines, going down to fourth seeds Benyapa Aimsaard and Nuntakarn Aimsaard in the women's doubles and compatriots Gayathri Gopichand and Sai Pratheek K in the mixed doubles. In her next tournament, the 2022 Syed Modi International, she participated in the mixed doubles, where she and Ishaan Bhatnagar clinched their maiden Super 300 title, beating compatriots Srivedya Gurazada and T. Hema Nagendra Babu in the final.

Achievements

BWF World Tour (1 title) 
The BWF World Tour, which was announced on 19 March 2017 and implemented in 2018, is a series of elite badminton tournaments sanctioned by the Badminton World Federation (BWF). The BWF World Tours are divided into levels of World Tour Finals, Super 1000, Super 750, Super 500, Super 300, and the BWF Tour Super 100.

Mixed doubles

BWF International Challenge/Series (2 titles, 2 runners-up) 
Women's doubles

Mixed doubles

  BWF International Challenge tournament
  BWF International Series tournament
  BWF Future Series tournament

BWF Junior International (2 titles, 1 runner-up) 
Girls' doubles

Mixed doubles

  BWF Junior International Grand Prix tournament
  BWF Junior International Challenge tournament
  BWF Junior International Series tournament
  BWF Junior Future Series tournament

References

External links
 

Living people
2003 births
Sportspeople from Dubai
Racket sportspeople from Goa
Sportswomen from Goa
Indian female badminton players
Emirati female badminton players
Bahraini female badminton players
Indian expatriate sportspeople in the United Arab Emirates
Indian expatriates in Bahrain